Everton is a district in Liverpool, in Merseyside, England, in the Liverpool City Council ward of Everton. It is part of the Liverpool Walton Parliamentary constituency. Historically in Lancashire, at the 2001 Census the population was recorded as 7,398, increasing to 14,782 at the 2011 Census.

Toponymy
The name Everton is derived from the Saxon word eofor, meaning wild boar that lives in forests.

Description
Everton is an inner-city area located just north of Liverpool city centre, with Vauxhall to the west, Kirkdale to the north, and Anfield to the north-east. The Liverpool entrance to the Kingsway Tunnel is located near the boundaries of this area.
Everton consists generally of more modern terraced homes, and is statistically one of the most deprived areas of the city.

History
Everton is an ancient settlement and, like Liverpool, was one of the six unnamed berewicks of West Derby. Until the late 18th century Everton was a small rural parish of Walton-on-the-Hill, but the rise in wealth of nearby Liverpool pushed its wealthier merchants towards Everton and further afield to live. By the early 19th century Liverpool's demand for housing saw Everton begin to be built up; Everton became part of Liverpool in 1835. Much of the land in Everton was once owned by the local Hodson family.

Along with neighbouring Vauxhall, Everton housed a very large Irish population. Sectarianism was one negative consequence of religious differences with tensions between Catholics and Protestants existing well into the 20th century. St Domingo Road in Everton was the intended site for the building of the Metropolitan Cathedral, but this was abandoned owing to financial constraints. The cathedral was eventually located in the city centre near to the southern edge of Everton.

Urban clearance during the 1960s and 1970s, followed by the creation of Everton Park, changed the face of the area and some parts have never recovered. The population has plummeted by over 100,000 since the 1960s; Everton Park has replaced the densely packed streets with fields and trees. The landscape of Everton is now mainly non-urban with the loss of so many people and many hundreds of buildings.

A new district centre on Great Homer Street was opened in 2017, code named 'Project Jennifer' it was advertised as a scheme to breathe new life into the rundown parts of Everton centred on Great Homer Street including a revamped 'Greaty' (branded Greatie) market. The project suffered numerous delays and setbacks through the proposal and construction stages, but was ultimately opened in June 2017, with the opening of a Sainbury's supermarket. The NSPCC Hargreaves Centre (named after locally born benefactor John Hargreaves) was opened in May 2007 on the site of the former indoor market.

Notable residents
William Connolly (VC), soldier
Thomas de Quincey, 19th century author
Bill Dean, Liverpool actor
Gordon Elliott, Australian journalist and talk-show host
William Gawin Herdman, author and painter
Paul Aloysius Kenna, cavalry officer and VC recipient
Paul McCartney, musician
George Mahon (Everton F.C. chairman), an Everton F.C. founding father
Prince Rupert of the Rhine, soldier
Robert Tressell, author 
Robb Wilton, English comedian and actor

The book Her Benny by Silas Hocking was mainly set in Everton and dealt with child poverty in the early 1900s.

Landmarks
 Everton Lock-Up
 Everton Road drill hall, TA Centre used by the 9th Kings during the Second Boer War and the First World War
 Everton water tower, listed building
 St George's Church, Everton
 Everton Library

Sport
The football club Everton F.C. (originally called St. Domingo F.C.) is named after the area (St. Domingo Methodist Chapel was in Everton). The district is also the location of a building on the club's crest, Everton Lock-Up, known locally as Prince Rupert's Tower. Barker and Dobson, a local sweet manufacturer, introduced 'Everton Mints' to honour Everton Football Club.

Ironically, Everton F.C. has never actually played in the area. Its first three homes were located in Anfield, including Stanley Park; the club has played at Goodison Park in the area of Walton since 1892. In addition, Everton Cemetery is also not located in Everton, it lies further north-east in the district of Fazakerley.

The football club Liverpool F.C. was originally founded as 'Everton Football Club and Athletic Ground Company, Ltd', or 'Everton Athletic', on 26 January 1892, as a consequence of the Everton F.C. split that resulted in Everton F.C.'s move to Goodison Park in 1892. The former Evertonians who founded 'Everton Athletic' to play at Anfield renamed the club 'Liverpool F.C.' on 3 June 1892.

Schools
 Beacon Church of England Primary
 Campion Catholic High School (demolished 2006)
 Notre Dame Catholic College
 Our Lady Immaculate Catholic Primary
 Whitefield Primary School

References

External links

 Liverpool City Council, Ward Profile: Everton
 Liverpool Record Office Online Catalogue for Everton
 Liverpool Street Gallery - Liverpool 3
 Liverpool Street Gallery - Liverpool 5
 Liverpool Street Gallery - Liverpool 6
 Evening images from Everton Brow
 photo of Congregational chapel, Netherfield Road, Everton

Areas of Liverpool
Irish diaspora in England